Mebeli michaelseni is a species of crab in the family Matutidae, the only species in the genus Mebeli.

References

Calappoidea
Monotypic arthropod genera